AKM Aminul Haque is a two-star rank Bangladesh Army officer and incumbent Director General of Bangladesh Ansar and Village Defence Party. Prior to join here he was Senior Directing Staff -SDS (Army)-2, National Defence College. Prior to Join NDC, he served as director of IT, Directorate of Army Headquarters as well as member of Board of Directors, Trust Bank Limited.

Early life and education 
After completion of SSC and HSC from Cumilla Cadet College he join Bangladesh Army. Haque was commissioned in Bangladesh Army on 22 December 1989 with 21st Bangladesh Military Academy (BMA) Long Course. He completed his undergraduate from the University of Chittagong and Bangladesh University of Engineering and Technology. He completed a master's in defence studies and another in security studies from the National University of Bangladesh and Bangladesh University of Professionals.

Career 
Aminul Haque successfully served as defence adviser at the Bangladesh High Commission in London. In January 2020, he came back to Bangladesh and join NDC course in Mirpur. Later he served as director of IT at Army Headquarter until he got promoted from brigadier general to major general. In December, 2021 he elevated to two-star rank and posted at NDC. He received his PhD degree in the 53rd convocation of Dhaka University. His research topic was ‘Development of Open Space Management System to Response Scenario Earthquake in Dhaka Metropolitan Area’. On 17th January, 2023 Govt appoint him as the Director General of  Bangladesh Ansar and Village Defence Party.

Family life 
Aminul Haque is married to Shimul Amin. The couple have two daughters and a son. His brother AKM Enamul Haque Shamim is a Bangladesh Awami League politician and the incumbent deputy minister of Sheikh Hasina government. His father engineer Abul Hashem is a freedom fighter and he runs a charity organization named Ashrafunnesa Foundation. His mother Ratnagarva Begum Ashrafunnesa was also actively participated in the Liberation War with her husband.

References 

Bangladesh Army generals
Bangladeshi military personnel
Bangladesh Ansar
Bangladeshi generals
Bangladesh University of Professionals alumni
National Defence College (Bangladesh) alumni